Claudio Martín Dadómo Minervini (born 10 February 1982) is an Uruguayan international footballer last playing as a left wingback for El Tanque Sisley in the Uruguayan Primera División.

Dadómo also holds an Italian passport.

Club career

Beginnings
Dadómo was born in Montevideo, and started his career there, playing for Montevideo Wanderers and Nacional.

Hammarby
In January 2008, Dadómo joined the Swedish club Hammarby IF where he played 8 matches in the Allsvenskan and scored 1 goal against Gefle IF, but soon after left the team in May 2008

Cerro
During 2008–2010 Dadómo played for Cerro, one of the most important teams in Uruguay. Was one of the most valuable player for the team. He scored 3 of the 5 goals with his team in Copa Libertadores. Cerro was the surprise of the Copa Libertadores and Dadómo was involved.

AEK Athens
On  July 5, 2010 Dadomo joined AEK. He signed a two-year contract with the team from Athens and the second player from Uruguay to play for the club after Milton Viera. He made his debut playing on an UEFA Championship on the 4 November 2010 against R.S.C. Anderlecht, where he played the whole match, which they finally drew.

Ergotelis
In August 2011, he was transferred to Ergotelis. He made his debut on 22 October 2011 against Panathinaikos.

Statistics

Club

International
{| class="wikitable" style="text-align:center"
! colspan=3 | Uruguay national team
|-
!Year!!Apps!!Goals
|-
| 2001
| 2
| 0
|-
| 2003
| 1
| 0
|-
! Total
! 3
! 0

Honours
Montevideo Wanderers
Uruguayan Segunda División: 2000

AEK Athens
Greek Cup: 2010-11

References

External links
 Guardian's Stats Centre
 Profile at Tenfield

1982 births
Living people
Footballers from Montevideo
Uruguayan footballers
Uruguay international footballers
Uruguayan expatriate footballers
Association football midfielders
Montevideo Wanderers F.C. players
Club Nacional de Football players
Club Atlético River Plate (Montevideo) players
C.A. Cerro players
Hammarby Fotboll players
2001 Copa América players
Uruguayan people of Italian descent
Citizens of Italy through descent
Uruguayan emigrants to Italy
Uruguayan expatriate sportspeople in Sweden
AEK Athens F.C. players
Ergotelis F.C. players
Uruguayan Primera División players
Allsvenskan players
Super League Greece players
Expatriate footballers in Sweden
Expatriate footballers in Greece